Nils Zatl (born 3 April 1992) is an Austrian footballer who plays as a second striker for First Vienna.

Career

Club
On 10 February 2020, FC Taraz announced the signing of Zatl.

On 20 August 2020, he joined Floridsdorfer AC. He left the club again at the end of the season.

References

External links

 

1992 births
People from Kirchdorf an der Krems
Footballers from Upper Austria
Living people
Austrian footballers
Austrian expatriate footballers
Association football forwards
SV Horn players
Doxa Katokopias FC players
FC Taraz players
Floridsdorfer AC players
First Vienna FC players
2. Liga (Austria) players
Cypriot First Division players
Kazakhstan Premier League players
Austrian Regionalliga players
Austrian expatriate sportspeople in Cyprus
Austrian expatriate sportspeople in Kazakhstan
Expatriate footballers in Cyprus
Expatriate footballers in Kazakhstan